Ge-trans-for-meer, the fourth studio album of Johannes Kerkorrel, was released in 1996.

Track listing
 Sê-Sê
 Europhobia
 Oe, die Kaap
 Changes
 Paradys
 Elvis
 Dawid Ryk
 Wanhoop in die Vrystaat
 Snor City
 My Ewig Ontwykende Beminde
 Boogskutter
 Onder in my Whiskeyglas
 Foto
 Ewig Jonk
 Berge Nog So Blou

Awards
1997 SAMA – Best Male Vocalist and Best Adult Contemporary Album: Afrikaans

References

1996 albums
Johannes Kerkorrel albums